Peter Kobelt (born November 17, 1990) is an American tennis player. He competed in the 2014 US Open alongside doubles partner Hunter Reese after receiving a wildcard into the men's doubles draw. The pair lost 4–6, 1–6 to Michaël Llodra and Nicolas Mahut in the first round. Kobelt was raised in New Albany, Ohio and is a 2009 graduate of New Albany High School. He then attended Ohio State University, graduating in 2014.  Peter plans to join The Champions Tennis Club Open Tennis Team in 2020.

References

External links 
 
 

1990 births
Living people
American male tennis players
Ohio State Buckeyes men's tennis players
Ohio State University alumni
Tennis people from Ohio